Torboy is a census-designated place in Ferry County, Washington, United States.

Demographics
In 2010, it had a population of 49. 28 of the inhabitants were male, and 21 were female.

Geography
Torboy is located in northwestern Ferry County at coordinates 48°40′48″N 118°39′47″W, along Washington State Route 21. It is bordered to the north by the Curlew Lake CDP.

The Sanpoil River flows through the community.

References

Census-designated places in Ferry County, Washington